Alexander Mack (1834–1907) was a sailor in the United States Navy and a Medal of Honor recipient for his role in the American Civil War.

Mack is buried in Saint Patricks Cemetery, Fall River, Massachusetts.

Medal of Honor citation
Rank and organization: Captain of the Top, United States Navy.
Born: 1836, Holland. Accredited to: New York. 
G.O. No.: 45, December 31, 1864.

Citation:

On board the U.S.S. Brooklyn during successful attacks against Fort Morgan, rebel gunboats and the ram Tennessee in Mobile Bay, on August 5, 1864. Although wounded and sent below for treatment, Mack immediately returned to his post and took charge of his gun and, as heavy enemy return fire continued to fall, performed his duties with skill and courage until he was again wounded and totally disabled.

See also

 List of American Civil War Medal of Honor recipients: M–P

Notes

References

External links
 

1834 births
1907 deaths
United States Navy Medal of Honor recipients
Union Navy sailors
People from Fall River, Massachusetts
Foreign-born Medal of Honor recipients
Dutch emigrants to the United States
Military personnel from Rotterdam
American Civil War recipients of the Medal of Honor